Henry Bond,  LL.D (born Cambridge 19 September 1853 – died Cambridge 6 June 1938) was an academic in the second half of the 19th century and first decades of the 20th.

Bond was educated at Amersham Hall School, University College, London and Trinity Hall, Cambridge, where he spent the rest of his career. He was Scholar in 1875; Chancellor's Medallist in 1877; Called to the Bar in 1883; appointed Lecturer in Roman Law in 1886; elected Fellow in 1887; and J.P. in 1906. He was Master of Trinity Hall, Cambridge from 1919 to 1929; and a Bencher of the Middle Temple from 1922.

Bond's pupils included Jan Smuts, Prime Minister of South Africa, and Stanley Bruce, Prime Minister of Australia.

Bond lived at Middlefield, a country house near Stapleford to the south of Cambridge that was built for him in 1908−09 by the architect Edwin Lutyens.

References 

1853 births
1938 deaths
Alumni of Trinity Hall, Cambridge
Fellows of Trinity Hall, Cambridge
Masters of Trinity Hall, Cambridge
People from Cambridge
People educated at Amersham Hall